San Sebastián is a town and municipality of Puerto Rico located in the northwestern region of the island, south of Isabela, Quebradillas and Camuy; north of Las Marías; east of Moca and Añasco; and west of Lares. San Sebastián is spread over twenty-four barrios and San Sebastián Pueblo (the downtown area and the administrative center of the city). It is a principal city of the Aguadilla-Isabela-San Sebastián Metropolitan Statistical Area.

History 

The permission to found the town was officially granted in 1752, under the leadship of the founder, Captain Cristóbal González de la Cruz, who among other residents had an interest in converting some cow farms into an agricultural village. The foundation of the town from the religious aspect, was consummated in December 1762 by Mariano Martin, the island catholic bishop at that time. At the beginning, by 1700, San Sebastián was a conglomerate of a few cow farms, owned by some residents of the Partido de Aguada. Las Vegas was the former plain site of one of the first cow farms located by the Guatemala riverside at the north. Also, another of those cow farms was Pepinito (today's downtown) that was a prominent hill with a white calcium carbonate face. On the north side of the town it can be seen some of this pepinos (cucumbers). These two cow farms gave the town its first name. From these geographical features come the first names of the new village: Las Vegas del Pepino (Cucumber Fields). In 1865 it is documented as San Sebastián de Las Vegas del Pepino.

At the beginning of the 19th century, wealthy Spanish families arrived in El Pepino, fleeing the revolutions of Venezuela and the Dominican Republic. Later, by 1850, several families from Catalonia and the Basque Country in Spain joined the large number of isleños (Canary Islanders) that had made El Pepino their home. These people, after taking over the local political power, developed a coffee industry and brought some material progress to the town. Basques in the municipality, in remembrance of their home region and its religious patron, saw the need of updating old traditions used by the Canary Islanders and started to call the town San Sebastián, and thus got the name formally changed by the central government authority. Nevertheless, the citizens of San Sebastián are popularly called pepinianos.

San Sebastián Mártir (Spanish for Saint Sebastian the Martyr) is the patron saint of archers and was chosen to be the patron saint of the town since its early history, first brought by the immigrants from the Canaries and later confirmed by the Basques, with the town name changed in 1869.

Hurricane Maria on September 20, 2017, triggered numerous landslides in San Sebastián with significant amount of rainfall. The hurricane winds knocked all the power out and the town was left in the dark.

The 40,000 residents of San Sebastián were left without electrical power.
Two weeks after the hurricane decimated the island, Javier Jiménez, the mayor at the time, noticed that help was not on the way. He decided that San Sebastián would not wait for the AEE brigades to come. He assembled an ad hoc team of volunteers, some who were retired AEE electricians, set safety protocols, and their mandate was to get the electrical power back up and running for the people of San Sebastián. 
Four months after the hurricane, they had restored power to 2,500 homes and continued to do about 60 homes each day. A monument honoring the accomplishments of the Pepino Power Authority, as they were quickly named, was erected in Plaza de la Identidad Pepiniana in San Sebastián barrio-pueblo.

Geography

San Sebastián is on the northwest.

Water features
 Guajataca Lake
 Río Grande de Añasco
 Río Culebrinas
 Río Guajataca

Barrios
Like all municipalities of Puerto Rico, San Sebastián is subdivided into barrios.

 Aibonito
 Alto Sano
 Bahomamey
 Calabazas
 Cibao
 Cidral
 Culebrinas
 Eneas
 Guacio
 Guajataca
 Guatemala
 Hato Arriba
 Hoya Mala
 Juncal
 Magos
 Mirabales
 Perchas 1
 Perchas 2
 Piedras Blancas
 Pozas
 Robles
 Salto
 San Sebastián barrio-pueblo
 Sonador

Sectors

Barrios (which are like minor civil divisions) in turn are further subdivided into smaller local populated place areas/units called sectores (which means sectors in English). The types of sectores may vary, from normally sector to urbanización to reparto to barriada to residencial, among others.

Special Communities

 (Special Communities of Puerto Rico) are marginalized communities whose citizens are experiencing a certain amount of social exclusion. A map shows these communities occur in nearly every municipality of the commonwealth. Of the 742 places that were on the list in 2014, the following barrios, communities, sectors, or neighborhoods were in San Sebastián: Guació barrio, Boquerón, Chinto Rodón, Estalingrado, Paralelo 38, Parcelas Perchas II, Pueblo Nuevo, and Tablas Astilla.

Demographics

Tourism

Landmarks and places of interest 
Established in 2016 is the Veredas Sports Complex in barrio Guatemala. The complex which consists of a modern skate park, a sand volleyball court, a zipline with four stations, a climbing and rappelling wall, an outdoor gym, a rope bridge, basketball and tennis courts, and walking paths, is set within an urban forest of about six thousand trees. Hacienda La Fe, an agriculture museum is located at the complex.
Other landmarks and places of interest in this municipality include:

The Robles Waterfall (located within the Gozalandia waterfalls zone) – It is a favorite with the locals however, several deaths have occurred at Gozalandia, including tourists

Church of Saint Sebastian the Martyr on the US National Register of Historic Places, is located in the Pueblo of San Sebastián.

There is a farmer's market held every Friday at the  that sells local agriculture as well as souvenirs, for tourists.

The Casa de Doña Bisa Museum located across from the main square in downtown features information on what life was like in the early 20th century.

Other sites include:
 Guajataca Lake
 Luis Aymat Cardona Coliseum
 Collazo Waterfall
 Hacienda El Jibarito
 Hacienda La Fe 
 Juan Jose "Titi" Beniquez Stadium
 Luis Muñoz Marin Ground
 Guajataka Scout Reservation

Economy

Agriculture

San Sebastián is a producer of coffee, fruits, and has dairy farms. There is a coffee production plant called El Coquí located in Perchas 1, a barrio of San Sebastián.

Government

Like all municipalities in Puerto Rico, San Sebastián is administered by a mayor. The current mayor is Javier Jiménez, from the New Progressive Party (PNP). Jiménez was elected at the 2004 general election.

The city belongs to the Puerto Rico Senatorial district IV, which is represented by two Senators. In 2012, María Teresa González and Gilberto Rodríguez were elected as District Senators.

Transportation
There are 30 bridges in San Sebastian.

There is also an air strip in San Sebastian, near Culebrinas River, which is visible on Google Earth. The air strip is for the use of RC airplanes.

Culture
In the town is a Fine Arts and Convention Center called Centro de Convenciones y Bellas Artes, which was in the last phase of its construction, as of February 2019.

Festivals and events 

San Sebastián celebrates its patron saint festival in January. The  is a religious and cultural celebration that generally features parades, games, artisans, amusement rides, regional food, and live entertainment.

The San Sebastián Heifer Festival (Spanish: Festival de la Novilla), celebrated every year on the first Sunday during the patron saint festival, is San Sebastián's largest festival attracting thousands of people. The celebration features carnival rides, the diverse music of Puerto Rico, cows decorated with flowers, floats and Puerto Rican cuisine.  In January 2016, the town celebrated its 40th Heifer festival.

Other festivals and events celebrated in San Sebastián include:
 Three Kings Day Festival – January
 Children's Festival – January
 Hammock Festival – July
 Lighting of the Christmas tree – November
 Cultural Evenings – third Thursday of the month
 Farmers' market – every Friday

Sports

The Luis Aymat Cardona Coliseum is where the Los Caribes volleyball team plays their games.

In amateur baseball or Double AA baseball, the city is represented by the Patrulleros de San Sebastián, who play at the Juan Jose "Titi" Beniquez Stadium and became champions of the Northwest area in 2019.

Symbols
The  has an official flag and coat of arms.

Flag
It consists of a rectangular flag of the usual proportions, crossed by a white waved band that separates its red superior part from the inferior one, which is green.

Coat of arms
The Mountains: With silver-plated borders, represent the characteristic mountains under which the vegetable namesake of the town grow (cucumbers) 
The Crown: Is the heraldic standard used to identify towns, villas and cities. The sugar cane and coffee ranches represent main agricultural products.

Notable people from San Sebastián
 Juan Beníquez, a former center fielder in Major League Baseball
 Ángel Mislan, (1862–1911) musician and composer of danzas "Sara" and "Tu y Yo".
 Nilita Vientós Gastón, (1903–1989) an educator, writer and journalist and the first woman president of the Puerto Rican Athenaeum.
 Luis V. Gutiérrez, first Latino to be elected to Congress from the Midwest.
 Nathan Lebron, first Latino to run for mayor of Albany, NY.
 Abimelec Torres, contestant on the second season of Idol Puerto Rico.
 Oscar Lopez Rivera, political prisoner.
 Luz Maria Villafañe, co-founder of the 'La Fogata Restaurant' franchise in Houston, Texas.
 Andrés Méndez Liciaga, made the Boceto Histórico Del Pepino
 Walter Cardona, wrote San Sebastián Del Pepino, Notas Para Su Historia
 Eliut González Vélez, La Fundación De Las Vegas Del Pepino and La Formación De La Etnia Cultural Pepiniana
 Ismael Nunez Pratts, Singer
 Edgar Arvelo, Singer/Announcer
 Marciano "Rocky" Duran, Singer
 Pedro J. Toro, Singer/Manager
 Altemio Sanchez, Rapist and Serial Killer
 Nena Rivera, Singer/also did Theater
 Junior Arroyo, Singer/Announcer
 Raphet Rosado, Singer
 Rosa Haydee Rosado, Singer/Actress
 Margarita Castro Alberty, Opera Singer
 Luz Odilia Font, Telenovela, theater and film actress
 Estefania Soto Torres, Miss Universe Puerto Rico 2020

Gallery

See also

List of Puerto Ricans
History of Puerto Rico
Did you know-Puerto Rico?

References

External links
 San Sebastián and its barrios, United States Census Bureau
 Puerto Rico Government Directory – San Sebastián
 San Sebastian Official Municipality page on Facebook
 Discover Puerto Rico – San Sebastián

 
Municipalities of Puerto Rico
Aguadilla–Isabela–San Sebastián metropolitan area
Populated places established in 1752
1752 establishments in the Spanish West Indies
1750s in Puerto Rico